Mineo (Greek: Menaion and Μεναί, Latin: Menaeum and Menaenum) is a town and comune in the Metropolitan City of Catania, part of Sicily. It has approximately 5,600 inhabitants. It serves as the center of the cult of Saint Agrippina of Mineo.

Among the churches in the town are:
Sant'Agrippina
Santi Pietro e Paolo
Santa Maria Maggiore

It is also a site of interest since Luigi Capuana, one of Italy's most famous writers in the 19th and early 20th centuries, hailed from Mineo and was at one time the town's mayor.  Mineo now houses a small library and museum dedicated to Capuana.

References

Municipalities of the Metropolitan City of Catania